A tonneau ( or ) is an area of a car or truck open at the top. It can be for passengers or cargo.

A tonneau cover in current automotive terminology is a hard or soft cover that spans the back of a pickup truck to protect the load or to improve aerodynamics. Tonneau covers come in many styles that fold, retract, or tilt open, and can be locked shut. Common materials used include steel, aluminium, canvas, PVC, fibreglass, and carbon fibre.

Tonneau covers are also used to cover and protect open areas of boats. Many of these covers are made of waterproofed canvas and are held in place by snaps.

The older, original tonneau covers were used to protect unoccupied passenger seats in convertibles and roadsters, and the cargo bed of a pickup truck or coupé utility. Hard tonneau covers open by a hinging or folding mechanism while segmented or soft covers open by rolling up or folding.

Truck and car tonneau covers keep items out of the sun and out of the sight of potential thieves.

Origin 

A tonneau was originally an open rear passenger compartment, rounded like a barrel, on an automobile and, by extension, a body style incorporating such a compartment. The word is French, meaning 'cask' or barrel, cf. “tun”.

Rear entrance tonneau
Early tonneaus normally had a rear-facing hinged door, but single and dual side doors were soon introduced. 

When the street was muddy or dirty, the car could be backed up to the curb so tonneau passengers could exit directly onto the sidewalk.

Truck use and styles 

Tonneau covers are used in coupé utility cars and pickup trucks to cover and secure the cargo tray and come in a variety of styles. Mainly they are categorized by material Soft or Hard covers. Soft covers can be rollup or folding and Hard covers are rollup, folding or one piece. 

The most common style is the roll-up tonneau made from cloth or vinyl, which uses a rib-like structure to support the fabric and keep it taut. A snap-based system is also used, but has become less common due to truck owners not wanting to install the snaps on their vehicle as they typically require drilling or permanent adhesive. Roll-up tonneaus are opened by rolling the cover up toward the cab of the truck. Hard roll-up tonneau covers are more firm than regular roll-up tonneau covers. They are made of a wall of individual aluminum slats, covered with soft vinyl. In the unrolled position, these aluminium slats form a hard aluminium shell, which not only covers the cargo inside the bed, but also may support loads up 400 pounds on top of it. 

Another style of truck bed tonneau cover is a retractable unit, which is mounted at the front and sides of the bed and rolls up or retracts from the tailgate towards the cab. The retractable tonneau is typically made of vinyl, plastic or aluminium. Retractable tonneaus are more secure than soft tonneau covers, since they usually lock and are made from a harder composition, but they take more time to install and are designed for  semi-permanent installation.  Fiberglass, hard plastic, or aluminium tonneau covers are also common. Some may be painted to match the truck, are solid in construction, and can be locked. These covers are usually heavy and require gas struts to assist in opening and closing. They operate much like a vehicle's hood, typically opening from the tailgate end of the bed (back to front). Some have multiple compartments that open front to back, back to front, side to side, or even rise vertically. Fiberglass, hard plastic, or aluminium tonneau covers are sometimes installed as a factory option on new vehicles. 

Many sellers claim that tonneau covers improve gas mileage because they make the truck more streamlined. However, air currents create a wake inside the pickup bed, which helps the aerodynamics. A similar effect is seen when the tailgate is down and the mileage goes down.

Race cars 
Early open-bodied touring-type automobiles used tonneau covers to protect unoccupied rear seats.  As early as the 1930s, lakes racers, searching for an extra competitive edge, imitated early automobile construction and skinned the cockpits of their roadsters and streamliners with removable canvas.  The skins covered gaping cockpits that would otherwise disturb airflow and create undue drag; as a result, tonneau-equipped cars ultimately went faster with a given amount of power.

Sports cars

Tonneau covers are available for open sports cars such as the Porsche Boxster, MG, Triumph, and Austin-Healey. These covers, often made of natural or artificial leather, cover the entire passenger compartment, and are zippered so the driver's seat can be uncovered while the rest of the interior remains covered.  Tonneau covers may be used in lieu of hard or soft convertible tops.

Other uses 
Tonneau case is used to describe a type of watch case, with rounded, bulging sides resembling a barrel (or cask).

References

Automotive body parts